Sir William Young,  (8 September 1799 – 8 May 1887) was a Nova Scotia politician and jurist.

Born in Falkirk, the son of John Young and Agnes Renny, Young was first elected to the Nova Scotia House of Assembly in 1836 as a Reformer (or Liberal) and, as a lawyer, defended Reform journalists accused of libel. When responsible government was instituted in 1848, Young hoped to become the first Premier but was passed over in favour of fellow reformer James Boyle Uniacke and Young became Speaker. However, Young succeeded Uniacke in 1854.

His government was accused of overlooking Catholics and tensions with Catholics were exacerbated by Joseph Howe's rupture with Nova Scotia's Irish Catholic community over his recruitment of Americans to fight on the British side in the Crimean War.

In February 1857, ten Catholic and two Protestant Liberals voted with the Tories to bring down Young's government.

Young returned to power in January 1860 when the Tory government was unable to command a majority in the legislature after an election. In July, the colony's Chief Justice died and Young, who had long coveted the job, was appointed to the position by the lieutenant governor.

He served as Chief Justice for twenty-one years and was noted for placing cushions on his chair so he would tower above his fellow justices. He died in Halifax in 1887.

Legacy 
 Young Avenue, Halifax, Nova Scotia is named after Sir William Young
 In 1887 (the same year that the Bandstand was built), the estate of chief justice Sir William Young, donated three statues and six urns from his own garden, to Halifax Public Gardens.
Nova Scotian artist William Valentine painted Young's portrait.
 The Private and Local Acts of Nova-Scotia By Nova Scotia, Sir William Young

References

Biography at the Dictionary of Canadian Biography Online

1799 births
1887 deaths
Canadian Knights Commander of the Order of the Bath
Premiers of Nova Scotia
Nova Scotia Liberal Party MLAs
Speakers of the Nova Scotia House of Assembly
People from Inverness County, Nova Scotia
Scottish emigrants to pre-Confederation Nova Scotia
Persons of National Historic Significance (Canada)
People from Falkirk
Alumni of the University of Glasgow
Colony of Nova Scotia people
Nova Scotia pre-Confederation MLAs
Colony of Nova Scotia judges
Nova Scotia political party leaders